The Battle of Waterloo: The British Squares Receiving the Charge of the French Cuirassiers is an 1874 oil painting by French artist Henri Félix Emmanuel Philippoteaux.  It depicts a scene from the Battle of Waterloo on 18 June 1815, with squares of red-coated infantry from Sir Thomas Picton's British 5th Division to the left being charged by cavalrymen of the French 5th and 10th Cuirassiers in blue uniforms to the right.  The main British unit is one of Highland infantry, with the colour party and a mounted officer taking refuge in the centre of the square.  Abandoned cannon lie in the foreground and middle distance. It measures .  

The meticulous academic painting was exhibited at the Royal Academy Summer Exhibition in 1875 and was described by John Ruskin as a "carefully-studied and skilful battle piece".  It is thought that the painting was bought by Francis Reubell Bryan in around 1875; he donated it to the Victoria and Albert Museum in 1880.   The V&A also holds a sketch, made in oils on paper laid on canvas.

References
 The Battle of Waterloo: The British Squares Receiving the Charge of the French Cuirassiers, Victoria and Albert Museum
 The Battle of Waterloo: The British Squares Receiving the Charge of the French Cuirassiers (sketch), Victoria and Albert Museum

1874 paintings
French paintings
Waterloo campaign in paintings
Paintings in the collection of the Victoria and Albert Museum